Huáng Shújǐng (黃叔璥, 1682-1758) was the first Imperial High Commissioner to Taiwan (1722).  A Beijinger, he was sent by the Kangxi Emperor of the Qing Empire, during whose reign Taiwan was annexed in 1684. He recorded his findings in Táihǎi shǐ chá lù (臺海使槎錄 "Records from the mission to Taiwan and its Strait").

Works

Qing dynasty diplomats
1682 births
1758 deaths
Political office-holders in Taiwan
Qing dynasty politicians from Beijing
Taiwanese people from Beijing
Qing dynasty high commissioners